Reese may refer to:

Places

Germany
 Reese, Germany, a hamlet in Lower Saxony on the River Aue

United States
 Reese, Michigan, United States, a community east of Saginaw
 Reese, Pennsylvania, United States, a community in Blair County
 Reese, Texas, United States, a community in Cherokee County, in East Texas
 Reese Center, Texas, United States, an area west of Lubbock
 Reese Technology Center, the former installation making up part of Reese Center

Other uses
 Reese (given name), a page for people with the given name "Reese"
 Reese (surname), a page for people with the surname "Reese"
 Reese, a ringname of Ron Reis (born 1970), American professional wrestler
 Reese House, an historic home in Hendersonville, North Carolina
 Reese's Peanut Butter Cups American candy marketed by The Hershey Company named after H. B. Reese
 Reese's Pieces, a type of coated candy
 Reese's Whipps, a type of candy bar
 Reese bass, a synthesized bass sound extensively used by electronic producer Kevin Saunderson
 Reese, a doll featured in the Groovy Girls doll line, by Manhattan Toy
 "Reese", a song by Big Red Machine from the album How Long Do You Think It's Gonna Last?

See also

 Justice Reese (disambiguation)
 Reece (disambiguation)
 Rees (disambiguation)
 Reis (disambiguation)
 Rhees (disambiguation)
 Rhys, a Welsh name